The Cusanusstift (St. Nikolaus-Hospital) is a historic building in Bernkastel-Kues, Germany. It was founded by Nicholas of Cusa in 1458. It contains a world-famous library and a wine museum.

Manuscript 52 in its library contains the only complete copy of the Proverbia Grecorum.

References

External links
St. Nikolaus-Hospital (dt.)

Buildings and structures in Rhineland-Palatinate
Libraries in Germany
Museums in Rhineland-Palatinate